Nifa Senior High School (NISEC) is a co-educational second-cycle institution in Adukrom, situated in the Okere District in the Eastern Region of Ghana.

History
A community-based institution, the school was established in 1971 as a product of the phasing out of the then Adukrom Teacher Training College by the Ministry of Education (now Ghana Education Service).  The general objective of the change in status was to provide full secondary school education to the growing number of boys and girls, especially those resident around the Okere community who had little chance of receiving secondary level education elsewhere due to shortages of such schools.

Boarding
The school has boarding facilities for both boys and girls. It also has a hostel outside the school for students who could not make it into the boarding house

Religious service
The school is a non-denominational institution. There is a complete freedom of worship. Morning assembly and Sunday morning worship must be attended by all irrespective of their religious background.

Enrollment 
The school has about 2,500 students enrolled in  Business, Science, general arts, general agric, Home Economics and visual arts courses

Facilities 

 3 Science Laboratories ( Physics, Biology and Chemistry)
 I.C.T Lab
 Library
 Home Economics Lab
 Visual Arts Center
 School Farm
 Sports (standard field for soccer and athletics, basketball court, volley and handball court)
 School Clinic
 Barbering shop

See also

 Education in Ghana
 List of senior high schools in Ghana

References

External links
 , the school's official website
 , the website of the Nifa Old Student Association

1971 establishments in Ghana
Boarding schools in Ghana
Co-educational boarding schools
Education in the Eastern Region (Ghana)
Educational institutions established in 1971
High schools in Ghana